Kansa, Bangladesh is a village in Jhalakati District in the Barisal Division of southwestern Bangladesh.

References

Populated places in Jhalokati District